Rondotia menciana is a moth in the family Bombycidae. It was described by Frederic Moore in 1885. It is found in Zhejiang, China.

References

Bombycidae
Moths described in 1885